The Basotho Democratic National Party is a political party in Lesotho. 

In the 2007 legislative elections for the National Assembly, the party won  1 out of 120 seats.

Political parties in Lesotho